Kleinschwarzenbach is a village in the German city of Helmbrechts. Dr. Seuss visited members of the Seuss family there to rediscover his heritage.

References

Populated places in Bavaria